The Anglican and Eastern Churches Association is a religious organisation founded as the Eastern Church Association in 1864 by John Mason Neale and others and of which Athelstan Riley was a leading member. The purpose for which it was founded is to pray and work for the reunion of the Eastern Orthodox churches and the Anglican Communion. In 1914 it adopted the present name when it merged with the Anglican and Eastern Orthodox Churches Union.  According to tradition the merger was arranged at a meeting under a railway bridge in Lewisham between the Revd H. J. Fynes-Clinton and the Revd Canon John Albert Douglas. In 1933 there was a dispute between Fynes-Clinton and Fr Robert Corbould on one side and Athelstan Riley and Douglas on the other.

The association publishes Koinonia: the journal of the Anglican and Eastern Churches Association; this continues E.C.N.L.  which was the continuation of The Christian East, a quarterly magazine, 1920-1954.
Also issued by the association was Stephen Graham's News Letter about the Orthodox Churches in War Time, issued monthly from 1940 to 1943, which was continued by the Eastern Churches Broadsheet, 1944 to 1954; after this came the Eastern Churches News-Letter, from Jan. 1955.

See also

 Fellowship of Saint Alban and Saint Sergius

References

Copac

External links
 
Anglican Eastern Associations: A Sketch, by Henry R. T. Brandreth (1945) from Project Canterbury

Anglican ecumenism
Religious organizations established in 1864
Eastern Orthodox organizations established in the 19th century
Eastern Orthodox ecumenical and interfaith relations
Christian ecumenical organizations